

Ch'iyar Quta (Aymara ch'iyara black, quta lake, "black lake", hispanicized spellings Chiar Kkota, Chiar Khota, Chiar Kota) is a Bolivian lake located in the San Pedro de Quemes Municipality, Nor Lípez Province of the Potosí Department near the border to Chile.

See also 
 Lake Kara
 Laguna Pastos Grande

References 

Lakes of Potosí Department